Monroe or Johnstown (Nugent) is a townland in County Westmeath, Ireland.

Monroe or Johnstown (Nugent) is one of 12 townlands of the civil parish of Templeoran in the barony of Moygoish in the Province of Leinster.

The neighbouring townlands are: Johnstown to the north, west and south, Wattstown to the north–east, Monroe to the east and Scurlockstown to the south–east.

In the 1911 census of Ireland there were 3 houses and 12 inhabitants in the townland.

References

External links
Monroe or Johnstown (Nugent) at openstreetmap.org
Monroe or Johnstown (Nugent) at the IreAtlas Townland Data Base
Monroe or Johnstown (Nugent) at Townlands.ie
Monroe or Johnstown (Nugent) at The Placenames Database of Ireland

Townlands of County Westmeath